The Tapado Glacier is a glacier in Chile

See also
 List of glaciers of Chile

References

External links
  Chilean glacier inventory at Glaciologia.cl of Andrés Rivera
 Satellite Image Atlas of Glaciers of the World, United States Geological Survey, Professional Paper 1386-I

Glaciers of Chile